Nolwenn Korbell (born 3 February 1968 in Quimper, Finistère), is a French Breton singer-songwriter.
Best known for her songs in Breton, with her musicians or in a duet with guitarist Soïg Sibéril, she released four albums, regularly performs in concerts, and also keeps acting in plays and films.

Biography 
Nolwenn Korbell spent her childhood in Douarnenez with her younger brother and her parents, gwerz singer Andrea Ar Gouilh and Hervé Corbel, also a Breton music amateur.
All four of them spoke Breton in their daily life, and Nolwenn learnt French at school.
She followed her mother during her tours in the Celtic nations, where she heard Welsh, Irish and Scottish people sing in their respective languages.

She began taking theatre classes in her teens.
Youenn Gwernig, the head of Breton language programs of France 3 Ouest, noticed her.
In 1984, France 3 bought the rights of a Welsh cartoon in order to dub it in Breton, and Gwernig gave her the female character's role.

During two years, she studied modern languages at University of Rennes 2, learning German, Breton and Welsh.
She spent three years in the Dramatic Arts Conservatory in Rennes, learning lyrical singing, and performing as a soprano in the band Arsis Théâtre Vocal.
She hosted television programs on France 3 Ouest.

In 1989, she appeared in a few episodes of the Welsh language soap-opera "Pobol Y Cwm", produced by BBC Wales for the Welsh fourth television channel, S4C.

Between 1991 and 1999, she lived between Brittany and Wales, the home land of her partner, Twm Morys.
She sang in his band, .
At that time, she played in short and long films by Olivier Bourbeillon, Simon Hymphries.
In 1997, she competed in the Kan ar Bobl, a Breton singing contest that brought to fame, among others, Yann-Fañch Kemener and Denez Prigent.
There, she sang  (My seamstress), a song she wrote as a tribute to her grandmother, and won the first prize.
In 2000, after the birth of her son Gwion, she went back to France in order to devote herself to theatre and singing.

The two heads of Coop Breizh were in the audience and offer her to record an album.

Music

(It is not over), her first album, was released in the end of 2003.
This title was chosen so that anyone can find their own meaning in it: it can, for example, refer to the end of a love relationship that leaves some hope, to the Breton language and culture that are still alive, or to a work of art, like the album itself, that is never over because it is always possible to give a new interpretation of it.

All the songs are in Breton, except  ("The new world"), which is in Welsh.
Korbell cited as her main source of inspiration the songs, often from the Barzaz Breiz, that her mother sang to her.

Because of her training as an actress, she took great care of pronouncing correctly, which is part of her effort in making her songs understandable by the largest audience.
She expressed one of her strongest convictions: the importance of Breton, and of languages in general: "I would like the world to keep all the colours that are under the sun", she said in an interview.

She included in the album "", a traditional song that her mother taught her, also sung by the Goadec sisters.

Another traditional theme is the subject of "" (Song of the girl who had nothing), inspired from a nursery rhyme designed to teach children the days of the week, the name of farm animals and the sound they make: everyday, the narrator goes to the fair and buys an animal.
In Nolwenn Korbell's version, starting on Wednesday, the narrator buys something that cannot be bought: a husband, a son, a heart, a voice and a life.
According to the author, "this song is a parable which demonstrates that what makes the salt of life is not negotiable".

The band that performed on  included Frédérique Lory on the piano, Tangi Le Doré on the bass, and d'Antonin Volson on drums.
This team remained with her until 2010.

In 2004, Nolwenn Korbell received the Imram award, given each year to a Breton language author for his or her whole work.

Her shows were produced by Big Bravo Spectacle, a company based in Saint-Quay-Portrieux.
She sang in many events, such as the Vieilles Charrues Festival in 2004, the Festival du bout du monde, the Nuit celtique in Bercy in 2005 and 2006.
In 2006, she performed in the Celtic Connections festival in Glasgow and a concert in Olympia with Gilles Servat.

Albums

N'eo ket echu 
2003, Coop Breizh

 Ur wech e vo
 Padal
 Ma c'hemenerez
 Glav
 Y byd newydd
 Son ar plac'h n'he doa netra
 Luskell ma mab
 A-dreuz kleuz ha moger
 Deuit ganin-me
 Sant ma fardon

Bemdez c'houloù 
2006, Coop Breizh

 Bemdez choulou
 Termaji
 Dal
 Valsenn Trefrin
 News from town for my love who stayed home
 Yannig ha mai
 Pardon an dreinded
 Dafydd y Garreg Wen
 Un petit navire d'Espagne
 Olole

Red 
(with guitarist Soig Sibéril), 2007, Coop Breizh

 Bugale Breizh
 Valsenn trefrin
 Billy
 Sant ma fardon
 Gourin
 Padal
 Anna
 Bemdez choulou
 Daoulamm ruz
 Kanaouenn Katell
 Turn! Turn! Turn!
 Yannig ha mai
 Glav
 News from town for my love who stayed home

Noazh 
2010, Coop Breizh

 Blues ar Penn Sardin
 Hir
 Mad Love
 Aet Oan
 An Dud
 Don't Try
 Anna
 Je Voudrais
 Kuit
 One More Day
 Misjac Na Nebi

References

External links 
 Nolwenn Korbell's official Myspace site

1968 births
Living people
French women singers
Breton-language singers
Breton musicians
Rennes 2 University alumni
People from Quimper